Liu Chong's empress (name unknown) was the wife of Liu Chong (Liu Min, Emperor Shizu), the first emperor of Northern Han, which considered itself the legitimate successor state to Later Han, of the Chinese Five Dynasties and Ten Kingdoms Period.

Very little is known about her based on historical sources — not even her name.  All that is known is of her existence and the fact that she was created empress by Emperor Shizong of Liao, to whom Liu Chong was a vassal, in 951, shortly after Liu Chong claimed imperial title.  Liu Yun eldest son of Liu Chong was born of her, as it is known that Liu Jiwen (劉繼文) son of Liu Yun was her grandson.  It is not known when she died.

References 

|- style="text-align: center;"

|-

Northern Han empresses